Okhli may refer to:
 Okhli, a village in North Khorasan Province, Iran
 Okhli, Republic of Dagestan, a rural locality in Dagestan, Russia
 Okhli-ye Bala, a village in Golestan Province, Iran
 Okhli-ye Forugah Farahnak, a village in Golestan Province, Iran
 Okhli-ye Pain, a village in Golestan Province, Iran